Cowboy Town  is the tenth studio album by American country music duo Brooks & Dunn, released in 2007 by Arista Nashville. Produced by the duo and Tony Brown, the album has accounted for four Top 20 country singles on the Billboard country singles charts: "Proud of the House We Built," "God Must Be Busy," "Put a Girl in It," and "Cowgirls Don't Cry." The album debuted at number 13 on the Billboard albums chart, selling 68,900 copies in the first week of release. To date it has sold over 400,000 copies.

Content
As with all of Brooks & Dunn's albums since the late 1990s, this album features songs co-written by Terry McBride, former lead singer of McBride & The Ride. Texas country singer Jerry Jeff Walker is featured on "The Ballad of Jerry Jeff Walker".

One of the McBride co-writes, "Proud of the House We Built," was issued in late 2007 as the lead-off single, and reached a peak of number 4 on the Billboard Hot Country Songs charts. "God Must Be Busy" and "Put a Girl in It" were released as the album's second and third singles, respectively. "God Must Be Busy" peaked at number 11, while "Put a Girl in It" reached number 3. "Cowgirls Don't Cry," another McBride co-write, was released as the fourth and final single. After the duo performed the song with Reba McEntire (who was also the song's inspiration) at the Country Music Association awards in November 2008, a re-recording with McEntire's vocals was shipped to radio, and from November 2008 onward, the song was credited to Brooks & Dunn and Reba McEntire. It was the highest-peaking single from Cowboy Town, reaching a peak of number 2.

Track listing

Personnel
Brooks & Dunn
 Kix Brooks — lead vocals, background vocals
 Ronnie Dunn — lead vocals, background vocals
Additional Musicians

 Robert Bailey — background vocals
 Eddie Bayers — drums
 Larry Beaird — acoustic guitar
 Mike Brignardello — bass guitar
 Tom Bukovac — acoustic guitar, electric guitar
 Mark Casstevens — acoustic guitar
 J.T. Corenflos — electric guitar
 Chad Cromwell — drums
 Eric Darken — percussion
 Dan Dugmore — steel guitar, lap steel guitar
 Haley Dunn — background vocals
 Kim Fleming — background vocals
 Paul Franklin — steel guitar, lap steel guitar
 Kenny Greenberg — acoustic guitar, electric guitar
 Rob Hajacos — fiddle
 Owen Hale — drums
 Vicki Hampton — background vocals
 Tony Harrell — keyboards, Hammond organ, piano
 Aubrey Haynie — fiddle

 Wes Hightower — background vocals
 John Barlow Jarvis — piano
 Jeff Kersey — background vocals
 Terry McBride — bass guitar, background vocals
 Reba McEntire — vocals on "Cowgirls Don't Cry"
 Chris McHugh — drums
 Jerry McPherson — electric guitar
 Brent Mason — electric guitar
 James Mitchell — electric guitar
 Greg Morrow — drums, percussion
 Gary Morse — steel guitar, lap steel guitar
 Wendy Moten — background vocals
 Jimmy Nichols — Fender Rhodes, keyboards, Hammond organ, piano
 Russ Pahl — steel guitar, lap steel guitar
 Kim Parent — background vocals

 Larry Paxton — bass guitar
 Pat Peterson — background vocals
 Alison Prestwood — bass guitar
 Michael Rhodes — bass guitar
 John Wesley Ryles — background vocals
 Rex Schnelle — electric guitar, percussion
 Paul Scholton — drums
 Hank Singer — fiddle
 Jimmie Lee Sloas — bass guitar
 Harry Stinson — background vocals
 Bryan Sutton — acoustic guitar, mandolin
 Crystal Taliefero — background vocals
 Russell Terrell — background vocals
 Lou Toomey — electric guitar
 Ilya Toshinsky — banjo, acoustic guitar
 Jerry Jeff Walker — vocals on "The Ballad of Jerry Jeff Walker"
 John Willis — banjo
 Glenn Worf — bass guitar
 Reese Wynans — Hammond organ, piano

Chart performance

Weekly charts

Year-end charts

References

2007 albums
Brooks & Dunn albums
Arista Records albums
Albums produced by Tony Brown (record producer)